King Solomon International Business School is a Primary, Secondary and Sixth Form school located in  Birmingham, England, on the old site of Waterlinks House; opening in 2015. It is a multi-denominational Christian school, although it takes in students of any faith or no faith.
It is a 'through school', catering for pupils of any gender between the ages of 4 and 19.

The school is part of the Woodard family of Christian schools (Woodard Schools), and also belongs to the Excell3 group.

The School
The school offers a curriculum for Primary, Secondary and Sixth form (GCSE and A Level). The school's specialism is in International Business and Enterprise and works with international firms to ensure that pupils 'develop skills aligned to the changing business needs of the 21st century'.

The National Curriculum is followed throughout the school. At Key Stage 4, students follow a core GCSE curriculum but have the option to take vocational subjects as well. The school year is extended with a five-week break in Summer instead of the UK standard six.

See also 
List of Woodard Schools

References

External links 
King Solomon International school finds new home at Aston University
New International Business School for 4-19 year olds in Birmingham
A new school for a new city
King Solomon International Business School - Department for Education - UK Gov
King Solomon International Business School - Official website
Woodard Schools - Official website

Primary schools in Birmingham, West Midlands
Secondary schools in Birmingham, West Midlands
Free schools in England
Free Schools in England with a Formal Faith Designation
Educational institutions established in 2015
2015 establishments in England